Gerald Howard "Gerry" Ashworth (born May 1, 1942 in Haverhill, Massachusetts) an American former athlete and Olympic gold medalist.

Career
Ashworth is Jewish.  In 1961 he tied the world mark with a 6.1 in the 60-yard dash.

He won the gold medal in the 4 × 100 m relay at the 1964 Summer Olympics.

The following year he ran in the 1965 Maccabiah Games in Israel, winning a gold medal in the 4x100, and a gold medal in the 400 m relay.

Ashworth attended Dartmouth College. He ran the second leg of the gold medal performance of the American 4 × 100 m relay team, which set a new world record of 39.0 at the Tokyo Olympics. Paul Drayton, Richard Stebbins and Bob Hayes ran the other legs.

He later earned an MBA from Harvard Business School.

See also
 List of notable Jewish track and field athletes

References

External links
 
 Biography, International Jewish Sports Hall of Fame
 Former Olympian from Maine recalls gold medal experience, Seacoast Online, Aug 14, 2008

1942 births
American male sprinters
Dartmouth College alumni missing graduation year
Jewish American sportspeople
Jewish male athletes (track and field)
Living people
Athletes (track and field) at the 1964 Summer Olympics
Olympic gold medalists for the United States in track and field
Sportspeople from Haverhill, Massachusetts
International Jewish Sports Hall of Fame inductees
Medalists at the 1964 Summer Olympics
Competitors at the 1965 Maccabiah Games
Maccabiah Games medalists in athletics
Maccabiah Games gold medalists for the United States
21st-century American Jews
Dartmouth Big Green men's track and field athletes
Harvard Business School alumni